Life with Feathers is a 1945 Warner Bros. Merrie Melodies animated short film directed by Friz Freleng. The short was released on March 24, 1945, and is the first cartoon to feature Sylvester the Cat.

The title is a play on the longest-running non-musical play on Broadway, Life with Father (the title being the only connection between the two works). Warner Bros. would produce a film version in 1947.

Plot
A lovebird decides to commit suicide after his wife Sweetypuss kicks him out of their nest.  The bird wants Sylvester to eat him, but the cat thinks the bird is poisonous and refuses. For the rest of the cartoon, the lovebird attempts to get Sylvester to eat him many times. The cartoon ends with the lovebird getting a telegram saying that Sweetypuss is moving out, so he escapes from Sylvester in order to keep himself from being eaten. When he gets home, he finds out she has decided to stay, and he starts looking for Sylvester again in order to get himself eaten.

Cast
 Mel Blanc as Sylvester the Cat, Lovebird, Telegram Guy
 Sara Berner as Sweetypuss, Housewife
 Dave Barry as Radio Announcer

Home media
VHS – Cartoon Moviestars: Tweety and Sylvester 
LaserDisc – The Golden Age of Looney Tunes, Volume 1, Side 2: Firsts.
VHS – The Golden Age of Looney Tunes, Vol. 2: Firsts
Blu-ray Disc, DVD – Looney Tunes Platinum Collection: Volume 3, Disc 2.

Notes
Life with Feathers featured the first appearance of Sylvester. Sylvester would appear in 102 more shorts in the Golden Age.
Life with Feathers was nominated for the Academy Award for Best Animated Short Film.
This cartoon was re-released into the Blue Ribbon Merrie Melodies program on March 3, 1951. Like most reissued Merrie Melodies at the time, the original closing bullet titles were kept.
This was the last cartoon to use the 1941–1945 opening rendition of Merrily We Roll Along and the last non-Bugs Bunny cartoon to have "WARNER BROS. PICTURES INC." and "Present" fade in after the WB shield zooms in. As such, the opening themes would be shortened, but the ending rendition still remained unchanged for another ten years.
In 1951, Chuck Jones reused a similar concept for Hubie & Bertie's final cartoon Cheese Chasers.
In the American and European Turner "dubbed versions" (and presumably other TV prints), Sylvester has black fur (similar to his current appearance). The restored version on Blu-ray Disc/DVD shows that Sylvester originally had a lighter bluish-black fur.
 The scene where Sylvester is rummaging through trash cans for food is reused in Kit For Cat, and Tweety's S.O.S. A similar but reanimated scene is also featured in Catch as Cats Can.

References

External links

 
 
 

1945 animated films
1945 short films
Merrie Melodies short films
Warner Bros. Cartoons animated short films
Short films directed by Friz Freleng
Films scored by Carl Stalling
Films about suicide
1945 films
Sylvester the Cat films
Animated films about birds
1940s Warner Bros. animated short films
1940s English-language films